The Italian regional elections of 1949 refer to the regional election were held in Aosta Valley and Sardinia on 24 April and 8 May. This was the first regional election for both region and the second regional election in Italy after the 1947 in Sicily.

Result

Aosta Valley

Sources: Regional Council of Aosta Valley and Istituto Cattaneo

Sardinia

Sources: Regional Council of Sardinia and Istituto Cattaneo

References

Elections in Italian regions
1949 elections in Italy